Pimelea amabilis is a species of flowering plant in the family Thymelaeaceae and is endemic to northern Queensland. It is a small shrub with narrowly elliptic or elliptic leaves and spikes of hairy, yellowy-green or yellow, tube-shaped flowers.

Description
Flowering occurs from January to August.

Taxonomy
This pimelea was first formally described in 1928 by Karel Domin in his Bibliotheca Botanica. The specific epithet (amabilis) means "lovable" or "pleasing".

Distribution and habitat
Pimelea amabilis grows on rocky outcrops, mostly from the Hann Tableland to Mount Garnet and Mount Surprise in north Queensland.

References

amabilis
Flora of Queensland
Malvales of Australia
Plants described in 1928
Taxa named by Karel Domin